The Royal Indian Air Force (RIAF) was the aerial force of British India and later the Dominion of India. Along with the Indian Army, and Royal Indian Navy, it was one of the Armed Forces of British Indian Empire.

The Indian Air Force was officially established on 8 October 1932. Its first flight came into being on 1 April 1933 with six RAF-trained officers and 19 Havai Sepoys (air soldiers). The aircraft inventory consisted of four Westland Wapiti IIA army co-operation biplanes at Drigh Road, Karachi as the "A" Flight nucleus of the planned No.1 (Army Co-operation) Squadron.

History

During the First World War, four Indian volunteers – Lieutenants Shri Krishna Chandra Welinkar, Hardit Singh Malik, Errol Suvo Chunder Sen and Indra Lal Roy – served as fighter pilots with the Royal Flying Corps. In September 1917, Sen was shot down and became a prisoner-of-war; and over the next 10 months, Malik was wounded and Welinkar and Roy were killed. ‘Laddie’ Roy destroyed 10 enemy aircraft before he fell, and on 21 September 1918, he was posthumously awarded the RAF’s new Distinguished Flying Cross.

In the inter-war years, the idea of self-determination gained widespread support in British India. In keeping with this, a committee chaired by General Sir Andrew Skeen met at Simla, in August 1925, to investigate the ‘Indianisation’ of the Indian Army’s officer corps. The creation of a military academy equivalent to Sandhurst was also examined. The Skeen Committee reported in April 1927, and one of its recommendations was that Indian cadets be accepted for officer training at RAF Cranwell. The bravery of the RFC’s South Asian pilots was referenced in support of this, and veteran Hardit Singh Malik’s impressive appearance before the committee lent added weight. Discussions between the British and Indian governments continued until Lord Birkenhead, Secretary of State for India, approved the creation of an Indian Air Force on 5 April 1928. The new service would be open to men of all faiths and castes drawn from every part of the subcontinent.

Formation and early pilots

The Indian Air Force was established in British India as an auxiliary air force of the Royal Air Force with the enactment of the Indian Air Force Act 1932 on 8 October that year and adopted the Royal Air Force uniforms, badges, brevets and insignia. On 1 April 1933, the IAF commissioned its first squadron, No.1 Squadron, with four Westland Wapiti biplanes and five Indian pilots. The Indian pilots were led by RAF Commanding officer Flight Lieutenant (later Air Vice Marshal) Cecil Bouchier.

The first five pilots commissioned into the IAF were Harish Chandra Sircar, Subroto Mukerjee, Bhupendra Singh, Aizad Baksh Awan and Amarjeet Singh. A sixth officer, J N Tandon had to revert to logistics duties as he was too short. All of them were commissioned as Pilot Officers in 1932 from RAF Cranwell. Subroto Mukerjee later went on to become the IAF's first Chief of the Air Staff. Subsequent batches inducted before World War II included Aspy Engineer, K K Majumdar, Narendra, Daljit Singh, Henry Runganadhan, R H D Singh, Baba Mehar Singh, S N Goyal, Prithpal Singh and Arjan Singh.

World War II (1939–1945)

During World War II, the IAF played an instrumental role in halting the advance of the Japanese army in Burma, where the first IAF air strike was executed. The target for this first mission was the Japanese military base in Arakan, after which IAF strike missions continued against the Japanese airbases at Mae Hong Son, Chiang Mai and Chiang Rai in northern Thailand.

The IAF was mainly involved in strike, close air support, aerial reconnaissance, bomber escort and pathfinding missions for RAF and USAAF heavy bombers. RAF and IAF pilots would train by flying with their non-native air wings to gain combat experience and communication proficiency. Besides operations in the Burma Theatre IAF pilots participated in air operations in North Africa and Europe.

In addition to the IAF, many native Indians and some 200 Indians resident in Britain volunteered to join the RAF and Women's Auxiliary Air Force. One such volunteer was Sergeant Shailendra Eknath Sukthankar, who served as a navigator with No. 83 Squadron. Sukthankar was commissioned as an officer, and on 14 September 1943, received the DFC. Squadron Leader Sukthankar eventually completed 45 operations, 14 of them on board the RAF Museum’s Avro Lancaster R5868. Another volunteer was Assistant Section Officer Noor Inayat Khan a Muslim pacifist and Indian nationalist who joined the WAAF, in November 1940, to fight against Nazism. Noor Khan served bravely as a secret agent with the Special Operations Executive (SOE) in France, but was eventually betrayed and captured. Many of these Indian airmen were seconded or transferred to the expanding IAF such as Squadron Leader Mohinder Singh Pujji DFC who led No. 4 Squadron IAF in Burma.

During the war, the IAF experienced a phase of steady expansion. New aircraft added to the fleet included the US-built Vultee Vengeance, Douglas Dakota, the British Hawker Hurricane, Supermarine Spitfire, Bristol Blenheim, and Westland Lysander.

Subhas Chandra Bose sent Indian National Army youth cadets to Japan to train as pilots. They went on to attend the Imperial Japanese Army Air Force Academy in 1944.

In recognition of the valiant service by the IAF, King George VI conferred the prefix "Royal" on 12 March 1945. Thereafter the IAF was referred to as the Royal Indian Air Force. In 1950, when India became a republic, the prefix was dropped and it reverted to being the Indian Air Force.

Post war, No. 4 Squadron IAF was sent to Japan as part of the Allied Occupation forces.

Partition of India (1947)
With the partition of the Indian sub-continent into two separate nations—India and Pakistan—the military forces were also partitioned. This gave a reduced Royal Indian Air Force and a new Royal Pakistan Air Force in 1947.

Dominion of India (1947–1950)

After it became independent from the British Empire in 1947, British India was partitioned into the new states of the Dominion of India and the Dominion of Pakistan. Along the lines of the geographical partition, the assets of the air force were divided between the new countries. India's air force retained the name of the Royal Indian Air Force, but three of the ten operational squadrons and facilities, located within the borders of Pakistan, were transferred to the Royal Pakistan Air Force. The RIAF Roundel was changed to an interim 'Chakra' roundel derived from the Ashoka Chakra.

Around the same time, conflict broke out between them over the control of the princely state of Jammu & Kashmir. With Pakistani forces moving into the state, its Maharaja decided to accede to India in order to receive military help. The day after, the Instrument of Accession was signed, the RIAF was called upon to transport troops into the war zone. And this was when a good management of logistics came into help. This led to the eruption of full-scale war between India and Pakistan, though there was no formal declaration of war. During the war, the RIAF did not engage the Pakistan Air Force in air-to-air combat; however, it did provide effective transport and close air support to the Indian troops.

When India became a republic in 1950, the prefix 'Royal' was dropped from the Indian Air Force. At the same time, the current IAF roundel was adopted.

Aircraft

Symbols, flags and emblems

Roundel

1933–1942: The RAF roundel was used from 1933 to 1942 as the IAF was first established as an auxiliary air force of the Royal Air Force.
1943–1945: This roundel was used from 1943–1945 in the Burma Sector during World War II. The central red disc was removed to eliminate confusion with the Japanese Rising Sun Emblem.
1947–1950: The Ashoka Chakra was an interim roundel used from Indian independence in 1947 till India became a republic in 1950.
1950: This roundel was adapted by the IAF in 1950 and kept it after India became a republic and is used to this day.

Fin flash

Ensign

The ensign had a field of air force blue with the Union Jack in the canton and the roundel of Royal Air Force superimposed in centre of inside of Star of India in the fly.

Badge

The badge had Tudor crown on top of ring with an eagle augmented in center. A ribbon in fly below with the force motto PER ARDUA AD ASTRA.

Commanders

At Independence, the head of the Air Force designated as the "Air Marshal Commanding, Royal Indian Air Force". On 1 March 1948, the title of "Chief of the Air Staff" was added, with a further re-designation to "Chief of the Air Staff and Commander-in-Chief, Royal Indian Air Force" on 21 June to maintain uniformity across the three armed services.

The "Royal" designation was dropped when India became a republic on 26 January 1950. Thus re-designating the head of IAF to "Chief of the Air Staff and Commander-in-Chief, Indian Air Force".

Air Officer Commanding RAF, India (1932–1938)

Air Officer Commanding-in-Chief, Air Forces in India (1938–1947)

(On 15 August 1947, the unified RIAF was separated into the Royal Indian Air Force and the Royal Pakistan Air Force)

(**Seconded from the Royal Air Force)

Air Marshal Commanding, Royal Indian Air Force (1947–1948)

Chief of the Air Staff and Commander-in-Chief, Royal Indian Air Force (1948–1950)

See also

Royal Air Force
Royal Canadian Air Force
Royal Australian Air Force
Royal New Zealand Air Force

References

Notes

Citations

External links
 The Forgotten Few; The Indian Air Force in World War II – KS Nair
 The Eagle strikes : the Royal Indian Air Force, 1932–1950 – Rana Chhina
 History of the Indian Air Force, 1933–45 – SC Gupta
 The Royal Indian Air Force, 1932 – 1947 – RAF Museum

Military units and formations established in 1932
1931 establishments in India
Military history of India during World War II